Kidurong's National Secondary School, Bintulu (SMKKID) was established on 1 January 1997 and is the fifth secondary school in Bintulu town. The school is divided into two sessions - the morning session and the afternoon session. The afternoon session consists of Form 1 and Form 2 students whereas the morning session consists of Form 3, 4 and 5 students. The school also has Form 6 which is divided into upper six and lower six. The school has 60 students in Form 6 and 2050 students in Form 1 and 2.

The school has been around since 1 January 1997.

Achievements
SMK Kidurong has excellent results in all three national exams each year, the PMR (now known as PT3), SPM and STPM. The Taekwondo club of SMK Kidurong has even made it internationally. The school also won on AstroKuiz state competition in 2013.

History
Sekolah Menengah Kebangsaan Kidurong, Bintulu (SMKKID) was opened at 1 January 1997 and was the fifth secondary school in Bintulu.

SMK Kidurong was forced to operate at the evening session only (12.50pm - 6.30pm) until February 1998 since all the classes were used by the students of Sekolah Menengah Teknik Bintulu during the mornings. At the first week, SMK Kidurong managed to get 252 students and 14 teachers. Tuan Haji Ali Haji Mudin was elected as the first principal of the school and he was given the responsibility to create the buildings of SMK Kidurong. The population of the school increased from year to year when they receive more teachers and students.

Since SMK Kidurong was just created, the number of things and the infrastructure was very limited. Hence, this problem was not so bad since the teachers found a way to strategically teach and make the school better. Along with the school motto "Maju Terus Maju" ("Advancing Ahead" in English), SMK Kidurong continuously gets better and operates systematically with the will to create as many successful students on every public examination year.

Location
SMK Kidurong is situated at the 9th of the 11 districts of Sarawak, Bintulu. The location of SMK Kidurong is very strategic since it is only around 14 kilometers from the Bintulu town. Besides, SMK Kidurong is actually situated in the Kidurong housing area which includes:
 RPR Kidurong (Phase 1, 2, 3 and 4)
 PETRONAS Housing
 ABF (Asean Bintulu Fertilizer) Housing
 BDA (Bintulu Development Authority) Housing
 SMDS Housing
 SESCO Housing
 Bintulu Port Housing
 Kidurong Height
 Kuarters Pendidikan

Since the location of SMK Kidurong is near the many different housing areas, SMK Kidurong is free from the hustle and bustle of the city. Besides, SMK Kidurong is also situated near:
 Kidurong Club Bintulu (KKB)
 Kidurong Golf club
 Recreational parks
 Millennium Park 1
 Millennium Park 2
 ASEAN Park
 Muhibah Park
 BDA Recreational park
 Kid's playground
 Football field
 ABF Beach
 Petronas Petrol Station, Kidurong
 BDA Public Library, Kidurong
 Sri Similajau
 Kidurong shops

List of Principals 
 Haji Ali bin Haji Mudin (1997 - 1999)
 Albariah binti Mustapha (2000)
 Bahtiar bin Afandi (2000 - 2003)
 Rohani Haji Daud (2003 - 2005)
 Haji Ali bin Sarbani (2006 - 2007)
 Rohani Haji Daud (2009 - May 2011)
 Richard Then Chiew Niew (Jun 2011- 2015)
 Rosli bin Salleh (January 2016 - now)

Mission
To create and run the education program strategically, pragmatically, systematically and dynamically in every aspect.

Vision
SMK Kidurong will become an institution which is successful in the education department while being able to create well-educated people throughout its life according to the Falsafah Pendidikan Kebangsaan.

Address
Sekolah Menengah Kebangsaan Kidurong
Peti Surat 2078 
97011, Bintulu
Sarawak, Malaysia

Secondary schools in Malaysia